Văleni River may refer to the following rivers in Romania:

 Văleni (Arieș) - tributary of the Arieș in Cluj County
 Văleni - tributary of the Câlneș in Neamț County
 Văleni (Iza) - a tributary of the Iza in Maramureș County
 Văleni - tributary of the Mureș